Arthur Grosser is a Canadian actor who was a professor of physical chemistry at McGill University, Montreal. He has done a lot of voice acting work in several animated series as well as in video games such as Splinter Cell and Assassin's Creed. In addition, he is the author of the 1981 book Cookbook Decoder and has had parts in several movies, his latest is the 2013 movie Honeymoon.

Filmography

Television
Urban Angel (1991) - Bill Rack
The Happy Castle (1989) (voice)
Ultra Seven (1985) - Manabe (voice)
Seeing Things (1981) - Coroner, Leopold, Dr. Rogers

Film
Barney's Version (2010) - Mr. Dalhousie
Hellhounds (2009) - Charon (voice)
Café Olé (2000) - Sydney Purvis
Ford: The Man and the Machine (1987) - Junior Partner
Charlie Strapp and Froggy Ball Flying High (1991) - Kung Tallkotte

Animation/Anime
Pinocchio (2012) - I, Phineas Cricket
Bonifacio in Summertime (2011)
Hugo the Movie Star (2005) - Dr. Loongkoffer 
What's with Andy? (2003) - Additional Voices
Wunschpunsch (2000) - Additional Voices
Papyrus (1998) - Raouser
Bad Dog (1998) - Additional Voices
Bob Morane (1998) - Professeur Clairembart
C.L.Y.D.E. (1991) - Additional Voices
Samurai Pizza Cats (1991) - Bad Max (aka Crow Magnon)
Second Debut (1991)
The Littl' Bits (1990) - Mayor Bossabit
Sharky & George (1990) - Dr. Jake Eel
Saban's Adventures of Pinocchio (1990) - Dr. Sorrow
Jungle Book Shōnen Mowgli (1989) - Bagheera
Diplodos (1988) - Bubbles
Adventures of the Little Koala (1986) - Duckbill
The Wonderful Wizard of Oz (1986) - Lord Kaliko
The Great Cheese Conspiracy (1986) - Conrad
John the Fearless (1984)

Video Games
Assassin's Creed: Lineage (2009) - Pope Sixtus IV
Assassin's Creed II (2009) - Jacopo de' Pazzi
Far Cry Instincts (2005)
Splinter Cell (2002) - Additional Voices

External links

 1982 Star News Article
 VintageVersesVoiced.com

Year of birth missing (living people)
Living people
Canadian male voice actors
Academic staff of McGill University
Canadian male television actors
Canadian male film actors
Canadian male video game actors